Diane Lynn Ninemire (born February 12, 1957) is an American softball coach. She was the head coach of the California Golden Bears softball team from 1988 until March 3, 2020 when she resigned—effective immediately—for health reasons. When she resigned, she ranked ninth all-time in wins in college softball history with a career record of 1,355-687-1.

Early life and education
Born in Omaha, Nebraska, Ninemire grew up in nearby Ralston and graduated from Ralston High School. Playing softball and basketball at Midland Lutheran College (now Midland University) in the 1976–77 season, Ninemire transferred to the University of Nebraska–Omaha after one year, lettering in softball and basketball there as well. On the Nebraska–Omaha softball team, Ninemire played at shortstop and left fielder. Ninemire graduated from Nebraska–Omaha in 1980 and completed a master's degree in physical education at Texas Woman's University in 1987.

Coaching career
In 1981 and 1982, Ninemire was an assistant coach under Donna Terry at Texas Woman's University. Ninemire then followed Terry to the University of California, Berkeley (Cal) in 1983. Ninemire became interim head coach in 1988 after Terry took a medical leave of absence and continued long term after Terry's death in June 1988.

When she resigned, Ninemire had a 1,355-687-1 record in 31 seasons. Cal won the 2002 Women's College World Series, the first national championship for any women's sports team at the school. Ninemire won Coach of the Year honors from the Pac-10 (later Pac-12) Conference in 1991 and 2012, NFCA Coaching Staff of the Year honors in 2002, and an NFCA Hall of Fame induction in 2009. The 2005 team shared the Pac-10 championship, and the 2012 team won the inaugural Pac-12 title.

Head coaching record
Sources:

See also
List of college softball coaches with 1,000 wins

Notes

References

1957 births
Living people
Female sports coaches
American softball coaches
Omaha Mavericks softball players
Omaha Mavericks women's basketball players
California Golden Bears softball coaches
Texas Woman's Pioneers softball coaches
Texas Woman's University alumni
Sports coaches from Nebraska
Sportspeople from Omaha, Nebraska
Basketball players from Nebraska
Midland University alumni
Guards (basketball)